Shivnath River (or Seonath River) is the longest tributary of Mahanadi River, which it joins in Changori in Janjgir-Champa district in Chhattisgarh, India. The name comes for the god Shiva in Hinduism.

Sources
Shivnath originates from Godari village in Gadchiroli district, Maharashtra and flows northeast for 300 kms and joins the Mahanadi river near the town Shivrinarayan in Chhattisgarh.

Course

Sale
The river was sold by the government of Madhya Pradesh to Radius Water Limited in 1998, to much controversy by locals. Arvind Kejriwal discussed this controversy in his book Swaraj.

References

Rivers of Chhattisgarh
Tributaries of the Mahanadi River
Rivers of India